Baeckea subcuneata is a species of flowering plant in the family Myrtaceae and is endemic to an area near the west coast of Western Australia. It is found on sand dunes and sandstone outcrops in the coastal parts of the Mid West region of Western Australia in a small area near Geraldton where it grows in sandy soils.

The species was first formally described by Ferdinand von Mueller in 1864 in his Fragmenta Phytographiae Australiae from specimens collected near the Murchison River by Augustus Oldfield. It is listed as "Priority Two" by the Western Australian Government Department of Biodiversity, Conservation and Attractions, meaning that it is poorly known and from only one or a few locations.

See also
List of Baeckea species

References

Flora of Western Australia
subcuneata
Plants described in 1864
Taxa named by Ferdinand von Mueller